Miriam Nash is a Scottish poet, performer and arts facilitator. She has published a pamphlet, Small Change (2015) and a full-length poetry collection, All the Prayers in the House, (2017). She received an Eric Gregory Award in 2015, was shortlisted for the Edwin Morgan poetry award in  2016, and won the Somerset Maugham Award in 2018.

Biography
Miriam Nash was born in Inverness, Scotland in 1985. She grew up in Scotland, and England and Wales. She won a Fulbright Scholarship to study poetry at Sarah Lawrence College in New York, where she obtained an MFA in 2014.

Nash's pamphlet Small Change was published by Flipped eye publishing in 2013. In 2016, she was Writer-in-residence at Greenway, the holiday home of Agatha Christie.  In 2017, her first full-length collection, All the Prayers in the House,, was published by Bloodaxe. As a poet and arts facilitator, Nash has worked with schools, museums, mental health organisations and prisons in the UK, USA and Singapore.

Nash currently lives and works in London where she teaches creative writing at the Ministry of Stories.

Awards
Nash received an Eric Gregory Award in 2015 and was nominated for the Edwin Morgan Poetry Award in 2016, for her pamphlet Small Change.  Nash was winner of the Somerset Maugham Award in 2018 for her poetry collection, All the Prayers in the House.

Poetry collections
Small Change (2013)
All the Prayers in the House (2017)

References

Living people
21st-century Scottish poets
Scottish women poets
21st-century Scottish women writers
1985 births